Marius Mapou (born 22 June 1980) is an international footballer for New Caledonia. He played in the 2008 OFC Nations Cup.

References

External links

1980 births
Living people
New Caledonian footballers
New Caledonia international footballers
2002 OFC Nations Cup players
2008 OFC Nations Cup players
Association football midfielders